Birk Anders (born 3 November 1967) is a former East German biathlete. During his career he won two gold medals at the World Championships.

Biathlon results
All results are sourced from the International Biathlon Union.

Olympic Games

World Championships
3 medals (2 gold, 1 bronze)

*During Olympic seasons competitions are only held for those events not included in the Olympic program.
**Team was added as an event in 1989.

Individual victories
4 victories (2 In, 2 Sp)

*Results are from UIPMB and IBU races which include the Biathlon World Cup, Biathlon World Championships and the Winter Olympic Games.

References

External links
 
 

1967 births
Living people
German male biathletes
Biathletes at the 1988 Winter Olympics
Olympic biathletes of East Germany
Biathlon World Championships medalists
People from Erzgebirgskreis
Sportspeople from Saxony